Euphaedra mondahensis is a butterfly in the family Nymphalidae. It is found in Cameroon and Gabon.

References

Butterflies described in 2005
mondahensis